is a pop duo from Japan consisting of Yuuka Nanri (vocals) and composer Yuki Kajiura (composition, lyrics and keyboards). It is part of Kajiura's solo project FictionJunction.

Biography

On July 27, 2004, the ending theme to Madlax, "Inside Your Heart", was released. In the same year, because of its popularity and the fact that it was Gundam SEED's one-year anniversary, "Akatsuki no Kuruma" was released as a single, which at its peak placed at #10 on the Oricon weekly rankings and sold over 19,481 copies in the first week.

After a hiatus of exactly a year,  an insert song for Mobile Suit Gundam SEED Destiny, was released, becoming the first voice actor single to hit #1 on Oricon daily rankings.

On November 23, 2005, the duo released their debut album, Destination which placed on the Oricon weekly rankings at #9.

On May 10, 2006, FictionJunction Yuuka released their fifth single after approximately eight months. That year, they also recorded a song, "Aikoi", for the Tsubasa Chronicle anime series, which was not released as a single but instead included in the anime's fourth original soundtrack. In November of that same year, they released the opening theme for Sunrise's Bakumatsu Kikansetsu Irohanihoheto, .

FictionJunction Yuuka held their first live concert entitled Premium Live 2007 on February 8 and February 15 of 2007. A new album, Circus was announced and it was released on July 4 of the same year.. As Kajiura is handling the music for upcoming anime El Cazador de la Bruja, their seventh single, "Romanesque", became the ending theme of the anime above. El Cazador de la Bruja was produced by Bee Train, whose anime productions FictionJunction Yuuka has also done songs for previously.

Discography

Singles
{| class="wikitable"
!#
!Information
|-
!1
|
Released: May 8, 2004
Opening song and insert song for the anime Madlax.
|-
!2
|Inside Your Heart
Released: July 27, 2004
Ending song and insert song for the anime Madlax.
|-
!3
|
Released: September 22, 2004 (May 8 2013 re-released)
Insert song for the anime Gundam SEED, which was at first released in SUIT CD vol. 4 Miguel Ayman × Nicol Amarfi, but because of the song's popularity and the fact that it September 2004 was Gundam SEEDs one-year anniversary, it was later released as a single.
|-
!4
|
Released: September 22, 2005 (May 8 2013 re-released)
Insert song for the anime Mobile Suit Gundam SEED Destiny.
First voice actor single in Oricon history to become #1 on the daily rankings.
|-
!5
|Silly-Go-RoundReleased: May 10, 2006
Opening song for the anime .hack//Roots.
|-
!6
|
Released: November 22, 2006
Opening song for the anime Bakumatsu Kikansetsu Irohanihoheto.
|-
!7
|Romanesque'''
Released: April 18, 2007
Ending song for the anime El Cazador de la Bruja.
|-
|}

Albums

DVD & Blu-ray Releases

FictionJunction
FictionJunction Yuuka performed alongside her fellow FJ peers in Yuki Kajiura LIVE Vol. #4 Everlasting Songs Tour 2009. She is credited as a vocalist for the FictionJunction Club single "sing a song" which was released on March 16, 2012.

Singles/Albums

Appearances

 TV 
 NHK - Pop Joins the World
 NHK - PopJam

Concerts
  - (December 23, 24, and 25, 2006 - Year-end concert for Victor Entertainment artists. Premium Live 2007 (February 8 and 15, 2007) - First solo concert.''
 Yuki Kajiura Live Vol. #4 Everlasting Songs Tour 2009 - Part 1 of 2 part performance (July 7-12, 2009)
Yuki Kajiura Live Vol.#10 “Kaji Fes.2013″ (May 13, 2013)
Yuki Kajiura Live Vol.#11 “elemental” FictionJunction Yuuka 2Days Special (February 8-9, 2014)
FlyingDog 10th Anniversary Live ”Inu Fes." (February 2, 2019)

External links 
 Official site
 Official blog

References and notes

Yuki Kajiura
Japanese pop music groups
Anime musical groups
Pop music duos
Musical groups established in 2003
2003 establishments in Japan

ru:FictionJunction
zh:FictionJunction YUUKA